Ohariu may refer to:
 Ōhāriu, a current New Zealand electorate
 Ohariu (New Zealand electorate), the same electorate with its previous spelling (no macron)
 Ohariu, New Zealand, a suburb of Wellington, New Zealand

See also
Ohariu-Belmont (New Zealand electorate), a former New Zealand electorate